The Party of Democratic Action of Croatia (Croatian and Bosnian: Stranka demokratske akcije Hrvatske) is a political party that represents the Bosniak ethnic minority in Croatia. It is a branch of the Party of Democratic Action in Bosnia and Herzegovina.

Its leader Šemso Tanković was a member of Croatian Parliament, elected on the minority list in the 2003 election and in the 2007 election.

References

External links
 

Bosniak political parties
Party of Democratic Action
Political parties established in 1990
Political parties of minorities in Croatia